Doris Ramseier (born 18 May 1939) is a Swiss equestrian. She won a silver medal in team dressage at the 1976 Summer Olympics in Montreal, together with Christine Stückelberger and Ulrich Lehmann. She also competed at the 1992 Summer Olympics.

References

External links

1939 births
Living people
Swiss female equestrians
Swiss dressage riders
Olympic equestrians of Switzerland
Olympic silver medalists for Switzerland
Equestrians at the 1976 Summer Olympics
Equestrians at the 1992 Summer Olympics
Olympic medalists in equestrian
Medalists at the 1976 Summer Olympics
Horse trader